Ricardo Jorge Caballero (born 20 October 1959) is a Chilean macroeconomist who is the Ford International Professor of Economics at the Massachusetts Institute of Technology. He also served as the Chairman of MIT's Economic Department from 2008 to 2011. He is a director of the World Economic Laboratory at MIT and an NBER Research Associate.  Caballero received his PhD from MIT in 1988, and he taught at Columbia University before returning to the MIT faculty.

Recently, Caballero's work has focused on Risk-Centric Macroeconomics and Safe Assets. He has also studied the aggregate behavior of economies with heterogeneous agents, the macroeconomic effects of irreversible investment in firm-specific assets, and Schumpeterian theories of technological progress through creative destruction.

Awards and Fellowships

In 2002, Caballero was awarded the Econometric Society's Frisch Medal with Eduardo Engel for their paper Explaining Investment Dynamics in U.S. Manufacturing: A Generalized (S, s) Approach.  He was awarded the Smith Breeden Prize by the American Finance Association  for “Collective Risk Management in a Flight to Quality Episode”, Journal of Finance, 63(5), October 2008 (joint with Arvind Krishnamurthy) and the Journal of Finance 2014 Brattle Group Prize for distinguished papers for “Fire Sales in a Model of Complexity,” joint with Alp Simsek.

In April 1998, Caballero was elected a Fellow of the Econometric Society and subsequently of the American Academy of Arts and Sciences in April 2010.

Selected Readings

 Global Imbalances and Policy Wars at the Zero Lower Bound (with Emmanuel Farhi and Pierre-Olivier Gourinchas) Review of Economic Studies 88.6 (November 2021): 2570–2621
 A Model of Endogenous Risk Intolerance and LSAPs: Asset Prices and Aggregate Demand in a "Covid-19" Shock (with Alp Simsek) The Review of Financial Studies 34.11 (November 2021)
 A Risk-centric Model of Demand Recessions and Speculation (with Alp Simsek) Quarterly Journal of Economics 135.3 (August 2020)
 A Model of Fickle Capital Flows and Retrenchment (with Alp Simsek) Journal of Political Economy 128.6 (April 2020)
 Missing Aggregate Dynamics and VAR Approximations of Lumpy Adjustment Models (with David Berger and Eduardo M.R.A. Engel) SSRN (November 2018)
 Reach for Yield and Fickle Capital Flows (with Alp Simsek) AEA Papers and Proceedings (2018): 493-498
 Fire Sales in a Model of Complexity (with Alp Simsek) The Journal of Finance 68.6 (December 2013): 2549-2587
 Collective Risk Management in a Flight to Quality Episode (with Arvind Krisnamurthy) Journal of Finance 63.5 (October 2008): 2195-2230
 Explaining Investment Dynamics in U.S. Manufacturing: A Generalized(S,s) Approach (with Eduardo M. R. A. Engel) July 1999, Econometrica 67(4), 783-826.
 External Vulnerability and Preventive Policies. editor (with C. Calderon and L.F. Cespedes).
 Macroeconomic Volatility in Reformed Latin America: Diagnosis and Policy Proposals. Washington, D.C.: Inter-American Development Bank. 2001. 
 Specificity and the Macroeconomics of Restructuring. MIT Press, Spring 2007 .

References

External links
 Ricardo Caballero's homepage at MIT
MIT Department of Economics website

1959 births
Living people
International finance economists
MIT School of Humanities, Arts, and Social Sciences faculty
Columbia University faculty
Fellows of the Econometric Society
Fellows of the American Academy of Arts and Sciences
21st-century Chilean economists
20th-century Chilean economists
MIT School of Humanities, Arts, and Social Sciences alumni
Pontifical Catholic University of Chile alumni